Edward Lambton, 7th Earl of Durham (born 19 October 1961), is a British musician and a member of the band, 'Pearl, TN'. He is better known as Ned Lambton.

Early life

He was born in 1961, the youngest child and only son of Belinda Blew-Jones and Antony, Viscount Lambton, eldest son of John Lambton, 5th Earl of Durham. A bonfire was lit at the top of Penshaw Hill (formerly part of the Lambton Estate) to mark his birth; he was later baptised by Maurice Harland, Bishop of Durham, in the church of St Barnabas, Burnmoor, on 23 April 1962 and an ox was roasted as part of the celebrations. His elder sister is Lady Lucinda Lambton, the broadcaster.

His maternal grandparents were Lt Douglas Holden Blew-Jones and the former Violet Hilda Margaret Birkin. His aunt was Freda Dudley Ward, the mistress of Edward, Prince of Wales from 1918 to 1934 before his relationship with Wallis Simpson.  Upon his grandfather's death on 4 February 1970, Lambton's father succeeded as Earl of Durham but disclaimed that title on 23 February that same year. During this short period, Lambton was known by the courtesy title Viscount Lambton, but afterwards used the title Lord Durham (as if using the courtesy title Baron Durham) to avoid confusion with his father, who improperly continued to style himself Viscount Lambton.

Career
Lambton stood for the Referendum Party in his father's former constituency of Berwick-upon-Tweed in the 1997 general election, gaining 3.4% of the vote.

He succeeded his father as 7th Earl of Durham in 2006, and has been involved in an inheritance dispute with some of his sisters.

Personal life
Lambton has been married three times and divorced twice.  In 1983 he married Christabel Mary McEwen, a daughter of Roderick McEwen (younger son of Sir John McEwen, 1st Baronet) and Romana von Hofmannsthal (a daughter of Raimund von Hofmannsthal and Ava Alice Muriel Astor). They had one child:

 Frederick Lambton, Viscount Lambton (born 23 February 1985).

Ned Lambton and McEwen divorced in 1995. She has since married the musician Jools Holland.  On 19 October 1995, Lambton married Catherine FitzGerald, an Anglo-Irish aristocrat, the daughter of Desmond FitzGerald, 29th Knight of Glin, and Olda Ann Willes. Their marriage did not produce any children and they divorced in 2002. She is now married to actor Dominic West.

In January 2011, Lambton married 28-year-old ex-model Marina Hanbury, who worked as a parliamentary assistant to Kate Hoey, M.P., until 2010. Marina's sister is Rose Cholmondeley, Marchioness of Cholmondeley. Edward and Marina have three children:

 Lady Stella Rose Lambton (born 25 October 2011).
 The Hon. Claud Timothy Lambton (born 1 September 2015).
 Lady Acony Belle Lambton (born 8 November 2017).

References

External links 

1961 births
Living people
Earls in the Peerage of the United Kingdom
Edward Lambton, 7th Earl of Durham
Referendum Party politicians